Hosa Jeevana is a 1990 Indian Kannada film, directed by H. R. Bhargava and produced by S. Shailendra Babu. The film stars Shankar Nag, Deepika, Ramesh Bhat and Sudheer. The film has a musical score composed by Hamsalekha. The film was a remake of 1989 Tamil film Pudhea Paadhai.

Plot synopsis
A ruthless ruffian sexually assaults an innocent woman, which traumatizes her. However, due to that rape victim, he gets reformed into a better human being.

Cast

Shankar Nag
Deepika
Ramesh Bhat
Sudheer
Mukhyamantri Chandru
Rajanand
Kunigal Nagabhushan
Mysore Lokesh
Bangalore Nagesh
M. S. Karanth
Shani Mahadevappa
Umesh
B. K. Shankar
Negro Johnny
Vaishali Kasaravalli
Sathyapriya
Sumathishree
Sarvamangala
Sheela
Radha
Srishaila
Chikkanna
Rathnakar
Ramachandra
Janardhan
Kuyili
Master Ravindra
Master Anand
Master Vishwas

Soundtrack 
All songs composed and written by Hamsalekha.

 Chaaku Chainu - S.P. Balasubrahmanyam
 Byadve Byadve - S.P. Balasubrahmanyam & Manjula Gururaj
 Laali Laali - S.P. Balasubrahmanyam & Manjula Gururaj
 Anatha Maguvaade - K. J. Yesudas & Chandrika Gururaj

References

External links
 
 

1990 films
1990s Kannada-language films
Films scored by Hamsalekha
Kannada remakes of Tamil films
Films directed by H. R. Bhargava